Gary Longhi (2 July 1964 - 2 July 2020) was a Canadian Paralympic cyclist who competed in road cycling elite events and took part in four Paralympic Games from 1988 to 2000. He was the first Canadian para-cyclist to be inducted into the Canadian Cycling Hall of Fame in 2017. In 1983, Longhi was involved in a serious motorcycle crash which resulted in a life changing brain injury and was severely disabled. He spent three months in a coma and had a tracheotomy.

Longhi died on his 56th birthday after going through euthanasia for two cancers, one of which was incurable.

References

1964 births
2020 deaths
Cyclists from Montreal
Paralympic cyclists of Canada
Cyclists at the 1992 Summer Paralympics
Cyclists at the 1996 Summer Paralympics
Cyclists at the 2000 Summer Paralympics
Medalists at the 1992 Summer Paralympics
Medalists at the 1996 Summer Paralympics
Canadian people of Italian descent
Deaths from cancer in Quebec
Euthanasia in Canada